Women's middle distance cross-country classic skiing events at the 2006 Winter Paralympics were contested at Pragelato on 15 March.

There were 3 events, of 10 km or 5 km distance. Standings were decided by applying a disability factor to the actual times achieved.

Results

10km Visually impaired
The visually impaired event was won by Lioubov Vasilieva, representing .

5km Sitting
The sitting event was won by Olena Iurkovska, representing .

10km Standing
The standing event was won by Anna Burmistrova, representing .

References

W
Para